Nicholas is an unincorporated community in Fluvanna County, in the U.S. state of Virginia. Nicholas is 266 feet above sea level.

References

Unincorporated communities in Virginia
Unincorporated communities in Fluvanna County, Virginia